Hurricane Plantation located near Vicksburg, Mississippi, was the home of Joseph Emory Davis (1784–1870), the oldest brother of Jefferson Davis. Joseph Davis owned 346 enslaved people and had a personal worth of more than $600,000 in the 1860 U.S. Census, making him one of the wealthiest men in the state of Mississippi.

The mansion at Hurricane was a three-story main house with two large semi-detached wings for entertaining, and a detached library. It contained indoor plumbing and an early form of air conditioning. There were also numerous outbuildings typical of a plantation of that scale. The residence was described in detail by Varina Davis (Jefferson Davis's second wife), in a memoir of her husband.

Davis had served as surrogate father and de facto guardian for his brother Jefferson Davis, who was 23 years younger. In the 1830s, Joseph Davis gave Jefferson the full use of more than  adjoining Hurricane. Jefferson Davis developed a plantation here, naming it Brierfield. Specific details of the arrangement are uncertain, as Joseph Davis retained ownership of the land. Jefferson Davis, and later his second wife and children with him, occupied Brierfield until the beginning of the Civil War in 1861.

After the fall of New Orleans to Federal troops and the increasing military presence near Vicksburg, Davis relocated from Hurricane Plantation with members of his family and some of his enslaved people to Tuscaloosa, Alabama.

The main house of Hurricane Plantation was burned by Federal troops in 1862, and the plantation looted numerous times by both armies during the campaign of Vicksburg. Only the library, a building independent of the main house, survived the war.

After the war Davis sold the property to Ben Montgomery, a former enslaved person whom Davis had assigned before the war as manager of his plantation, and a group of freedmen. They financed the sale by a long-term note. Davis died in 1870. He was buried in the Davis Family cemetery on Davis Island, but his gravestone has been damaged.

He had several legally acknowledged illegitimate daughters, but no legitimate children. His heirs foreclosed on the note with Montgomery & Sons, after they were unable to make payments due to declining cotton prices and losses because of years of floods (1867, 1868, 1871, and 1874) that damaged the property. Montgomery died in 1877.

Confusion as to the titles of the Hurricane and Brierfield properties led to lawsuits for control between Jefferson Davis and his brother's heirs. Jefferson ultimately gained title to the Brierfield property in 1878 but never lived there again. Joseph Davis's grandchildren (from one of his legally acknowledged illegitimate daughters) received Hurricane.

A canal had been cut across the peninsula for flood control. It was claimed by the Mississippi River in 1867 as the main channel when a major flood changed its route. The former peninsula was renamed as Davis Island.

The main buildings of Brierfield Plantation burned down in 1931. Despite increasing damage from floods, the Davis family retained the properties until 1953. It was sold and quickly flipped to a lawyer from Vidalia, Louisiana, who reserved it for hunting. He and his family established the Brierfield Hunting Club, so private that it has people come by invitation only.

Sources

Former buildings and structures in Mississippi
Houses in Warren County, Mississippi
Mississippi populated places on the Mississippi River